Huang Chieh (2 November 1902 – 14 January 1995) was a Kuomintang Army General from Hunan and was considered one of the best generals and administrators in Taiwan's Nationalist China leadership.

He was commissioned into the Cavalry Branch as a graduate of the first class of Whampoa Military Academy in 1922. As a young Major, he studied at the Prussian Military Academy in Germany between 1929 and 1930, qualifying the main General Staff Course. After mainland China fell under the control of the Chinese Communist Party in 1949, General Huang led 30,000 Republic of China Army soldiers to Vietnam and they were stationed at Phu Quoc Island. Later, the army moved to Taiwan in June 1953. There is currently a small island in Chengcing Lake that was constructed in November 1955 and named Phu Quoc Island (富國島) in memory of the fleeing Chinese soldiers in 1949.

Huang was Governor of Taiwan Province from 1962 to 1969 and the ROC Minister of Defense from 1969 to 1972. He was fluent in German, French and Russian.

References

|-

1902 births
1995 deaths
National Revolutionary Army generals from Hunan
Politicians from Changsha
Kuomintang politicians in Taiwan
Republic of China politicians from Hunan
Chairpersons of the Taiwan Provincial Government
Taiwanese Ministers of National Defense
Taiwanese people from Hunan
Chinese expatriates in Germany